Qasmūna bint Ismāʿil, sometimes called Xemone, was an Iberian Jewish poet. She is the only female Arabic-language Jewish poet attested from medieval Andalusia, and, along with Sarah of Yemen and the anonymous wife of Dunash ben Labrat, one of few known female Jewish poets throughout the Middle Ages.

Biography
Little is known about Qasmūna's life. Both surviving sources say that her father was Jewish and that he taught her the art of verse. Whereas al-Maqqari simply calls him Ismāʿil al-Yahudi, however, al-Suyuti calls him Ismāʿil ibn Bagdāla al-Yahudi, and says Qasmūna lived in the twelfth century CE. It has been speculated that Qasmūna's father was Samuel ibn Naghrillah (d. ), or that Samuel was otherwise an ancestor, which would make Qasmuna an eleventh-century rather than a twelfth-century poet, but the foundations for these claims are shaky.

Three poems by Qasmūna survive, due to being recorded by two later anthologists: Al-Suyuti, in his fifteenth-century Nuzhat al-julasāʼ fī ashʻār al-nisā, an anthology of women's verse, and Ahmed Mohammed al-Maqqari, in his seventeenth-century Nafḥ al-ṭīb. Al-Suyuti, and conceivably also al-Maqqari, seems to have derived the material from an earlier anthology of Andalusian verse, the Kitāb al-Maghrib by Ibn Sa'id al-Maghribi; but it seems that the verses do not appear in surviving manuscripts of that work.

Works

Three poems by Qasmūna are known.

1
One is part of a verse-capping challenge set by Qasmūna's father. As edited and translated by Nichols, he begins:

To which Qasmūna replies:

The missing word in this verse is assumed to be a word denoting a woman of some kind.

2

The most famous of Qasmūna's poems, widely anthologised, is introduced by the comment that she looked in the mirror one day and saw that she was beautiful and had reached the time of marriage. She then utters this verse:

3

The last of Qasmūna's known poems runs:

References

Arabic-language women poets
Arabic-language poets
Medieval Jewish poets
12th-century women writers
12th-century Arabic writers
Women poets from al-Andalus
12th-century Jews from al-Andalus
12th-century poets
Medieval Jewish women
Medieval Spanish women writers
12th-century Spanish writers
Jewish women writers
Judeo-Arabic writers